Goldberger is a surname of Jewish origin. Notable people with the surname include:

Science 
Arthur Goldberger (1930–2009), economist
Joseph Goldberger (1874–1929), physician
Marvin Leonard Goldberger (1922–2014), physicist

Sports
Andreas Goldberger (born 1972), ski jumper

Journalism
Paul Goldberger (born 1950), New York architecture critic and journalist

Art
 Julian Goldberger, Independent film director

See also 
 3101 Goldberger, asteroid
 Goldberg Variations (disambiguation)
 Goldberger–Wise mechanism, in particle physics
 Goldbergturm, the water tower on the Goldberg, Germany
 Goldberger's ECG leads – see ECG#Augmented limb leads
 Goldberg (disambiguation)
 Goldenberg

German-language surnames
Jewish surnames
Yiddish-language surnames